The Ephraim Relief Society Granary is a two-story stone granary located at 86 N. Main St. Ephraim, Utah which was listed on the National Register of Historic Places in 2019.

It is a Relief Society building which was built in the 1870s.  

It faces west onto Main St. in Ephraim.
It was rehabilitated in 1991.

It is home of "Granary Arts", an art gallery and community education space.

References

		
National Register of Historic Places in Sanpete County, Utah
Granaries
Buildings and structures completed in 1875
19th-century Latter Day Saint church buildings
Relief Society buildings